Emma Jung (born Emma Marie Rauschenbach, 30 March 1882 – 27 November 1955) was a Swiss Jungian analyst and author. She married Carl Jung, financing and helping him to become the prominent psychiatrist and founder of analytical psychology, and together they had five children. She was his "intellectual editor" to the end of her life. After her death, Jung described her as "a Queen".

Early life
Emma Rauschenbach was the daughter of a wealthy industrialist, Johannes Rauschenbach, the then owner of IWC Schaffhausen. At the time of her marriage she was the second-richest heiress in Switzerland.

Family life
Emma Rauschenbach first met C. G. Jung in 1896 when she was still a schoolgirl, through a connection of his mother. Jung reported at the time that he knew then that one day Emma would be his wife. The couple married on 14 February 1903, seven years later. They had five children (four daughters and one son): Agathe, Gret, Franz Karl, Marianne, and Helene.

Upon her father's death in 1905, Emma and her sister, together with their husbands, became owners of IWC Schaffhausen - the International Watch Company, manufacturers of luxury time-pieces. Emma's brother-in-law became the principal proprietor, but the Jungs remained shareholders in a thriving business that ensured the family's financial security for decades.

Emma Jung not only took a strong interest in her husband's work, but assisted him and became a noted analyst in her own right. She developed a particular focus on the Grail. She had a brief correspondence of her own with Sigmund Freud, during 1910–11. In 1906, Freud interpreted several of Jung's dreams of the period as portending the "failure of a marriage for money" (das Scheitern einer Geldheirat).

Death
Emma died in 1955, predeceasing Carl Jung by almost six years. After her death from a recurrence of cancer, he carved a stone in her name, "She was the foundation of my house". He is also said to have wailed, "She was a queen! She was a queen!" ("Sie war eine Königin! Sie war eine Königin!") as he grieved for her. Her gravestone was inscribed: "Oh vase, sign of devotion and obedience."

Bibliography

Works about Emma Jung
 
 
 
 
  The book was featured as Book of the Week on BBC Radio 4 2–6 January 2017 in 5 episodes, read by Deborah Findlay and Henry Goodman.

References

Further reading

External links

 C. G. Jungs drei "Hauptfrauen" This is a private website run by a couple of psychologists in Erlangen, Germany. There is no way of knowing whether it has any accreditation or independent standing.

1955 deaths
Rauschenbach, Emma
Swiss women psychologists
Jungian psychologists
Swiss psychoanalysts
Psychology writers
Swiss occult writers
20th-century Swiss writers
20th-century Swiss women writers
Holy Grail
Carl Jung
20th-century Swiss businesspeople
20th-century psychologists